Charles Joseph Hullmandel (15 June 1789 – 15 November 1850) was born in London, where he maintained a lithographic establishment on Great Marlborough Street from about 1819 until his death.

He was born in Queen Street, Mayfair. His father was a German-speaking musician and composer, Nicolaus Joseph Hüllmandel (1751–1823), a native of Strasbourg who became a pupil of C. P. E. Bach and from 1780 spent ten years as a fashionable music teacher in Paris. In 1787 he married a Mademoiselle du Cazan, who was of a noble French family, and in 1789 sent his wife to England, following her in 1790, as the French Revolution unfolded.

As a young man, Charles Hullmandel studied art and spent several years living and working in continental Europe. He learned printmaking and printed many of his own works. In 1818, he set up a printing press in London after a visit to Munich with Rudolph Ackermann, and went on to study chemistry under Michael Faraday for the purpose of improving his printing.

During the first half of the 19th century Hullmandel became one of the most important figures in the development of British lithography, and his name appears on the imprints of thousands of lithographic prints.  He developed a method for reproducing gradations in tones and for creating the effect of soft colour washes which enabled the printed reproduction of Romantic landscape paintings of the type made popular in England by J. M. W. Turner.  Hullmandel's essay The Art of Drawing on Stone (1824) was an important handbook of lithography.  In 1843 he went into partnership with Joseph Fowell Walton (born 1812, living 1863), a cousin of the landscape artist and lithographer W. L. Walton, the firm then becoming known as Hullmandel & Walton.

He died at Westminster in 1850 and was buried on the western side of Highgate Cemetery.

Further reading

References

External links

 Pictures of C. J. Hullmandel in the online database VIATIMAGES
 National Maritime Museum
 British Museum

English printmakers
English lithographers
1789 births
1850 deaths
Burials at Highgate Cemetery